The 2021–22 season was the 114th season in the existence of Inter Milan and the club's 106th consecutive season in the top division of Italian football. In addition to the domestic league, Inter participated in this season's editions of the Coppa Italia, the Supercoppa Italiana and the UEFA Champions League, winning the former two tournaments.

Kits
Supplier: Nike / Sponsors: Socios.com (front) / Lenovo (back) / DigitalBits (sleeve)

Players

First-team squad

Youth academy players

Transfers

In

Transfers

On loan

Loan returns

Out

Transfers

Loans out

Loans ended

Notes

Pre-season and friendlies

Competitions

Overview

Serie A

League table

Results summary

Results by round

Matches
The league fixtures were announced on 14 July 2021.

Coppa Italia

Supercoppa Italiana

UEFA Champions League

Group stage

The draw for the group stage was held on 26 August 2021.

Knockout phase

Round of 16
The draw for the round of 16 was held on 13 December 2021.

Statistics

Appearances and goals

|-
! colspan=14 style="background:#dcdcdc; text-align:center| Goalkeepers

|-
! colspan=14 style="background:#dcdcdc; text-align:center| Defenders

      
      

|-
! colspan=14 style="background:#dcdcdc; text-align:center| Midfielders 

                
|-
! colspan=14 style="background:#dcdcdc; text-align:center| Forwards

|-
! colspan=14 style="background:#dcdcdc; text-align:center| Players transferred out during the season

Goalscorers

Clean sheets

Disciplinary record

References

Inter Milan seasons
Inter Milan
Inter Milan